The "Maximum Battleships", also known as the "Tillman Battleships", were a series of World War I-era design studies for extremely large battleships, prepared in late 1916 and early 1917 upon the order of Senator "Pitchfork" Benjamin Tillman by the Bureau of Construction and Repair (C&R) of the United States Navy. The Navy was not interested in the designs and drew them up to win support from the Committee on Naval Affairs, on which Tillman sat. The plans prepared for the senator were preserved by C&R in the first of its "Spring Styles" books, where it kept various warship designs conceptualized between 1911 and 1925.

Context
During the years leading up to World War I, some members of the U.S. Congress were growing frustrated with what they perceived to be chronic overspending by the U.S. Navy on battleships.  Senator Tillman had grown impatient with the U.S. Navy's requests for larger battleships every year as well as the Navy's habit of building battleships significantly larger than Congress authorized.  He accordingly instructed the Navy to design "maximum battleships", the largest battleships that they could use.

The only limits on the potential size of an American battleship were the dimensions of the locks of the Panama Canal.

Designs

Tillman's first request for designs of so-called "maximum battleship" in 1912–1913 led to several estimates for battleships unconstrained by cost. Although C&R was "appalled," in the words of naval historian Norman Friedman, by the extravagance of these designs, they admitted that far larger warships could transit the Panama Canal's locks, which, due to the US's geography, were often held to be the final limiting factor on the size of a US warship. Such larger designs would be often and seriously proposed within only a few years.

In 1916, Tillman repeated his request, and C&R produced another series of design studies. C&R drew up four blueprints, all ships having varying characteristics despite being built on the same hull:

After the first four design studies were complete, Design IV was chosen for further development and three additional studies.  Based upon Design IV, three additional designs were prepared: IV-1, IV-2, and IV-3. At the request of Secretary of the Navy Josephus Daniels, these designs used  guns instead of the  50-caliber guns used in the earlier studies. The navy decided that design IV-2 was the most practical (or perhaps the least impractical) and presented it to Congress early in 1917.

Comparisons to other US Navy Battleships
These designs differed from the battleships being built in two significant ways beyond just their size. Firstly, unlike preceding classes, the "maximum battleships" were designed with a continuous flush main deck. Most battleships in this era had a long forecastle deck. Secondly, the Tillman designs all included five casemate guns mounted aft, two on each side and one at the tip of the stern. They had transpired to be too "wet" – heavy seas rendered them unusable—and they had been removed from all earlier classes. However, the casemates on the "maximum battleships" would have been higher above the waterline than they had been on earlier designs, so it is possible that their huge size and flush decks would have provided enough freeboard astern to keep the casemates dry.

Fate of the Designed Battleships
The Washington Naval Treaty of 1922 limited naval armaments, causing the cancellation of the South Dakotas and halting all consideration of the "maximum battleships."

See also
 
 Gavrilo battleship - Russian project (1914 year, 265/34,4/9,15 m, 16x406/45, 24x152/55, 30 knots)

References

Bibliography 
 Friedman, Norman. Battleship Design and Development, 1905–1945. New York: Mayflower Books, 1978. . OCLC .

External links
 An extensive article about the Tillman battleships, including a look at possible designs for "Tillman battlecruisers.". Retrieved 5 May 2012
 Tillman battleships entry at Global Security
 Design for 80,000-ton battleship prepared by C&R for Senator Tillman, dated 29 December 1916, from U.S. Naval Historical Center. Retrieved 5 May 2012.
 "Construction of battleships", includes the 1912 resolution
 The Shipscribe article on the Bureau of Ships' "Spring Styles" Book # 1 (1911-1925).  This specific webpage publicly preserves, among other things, the "maximum battleship" designs as digital photographs from the first "Spring Styles" US Navy catalog, and describes how they were presented therein.  Quoting Shipscribe's About page: "The "Spring Styles" drawings were added on 26 April 2015... following the deletion of the Online Library of Selected Images from the web site of the Naval History and Heritage Command."

World War I battleships of the United States
Battleships
Battleships of the United States Navy
Benjamin Tillman